The constitution of Cape Verde provides for freedom of religion, and the government has generally respected this right in practice. Government policy continued to contribute to the generally free practice of religion. There were no reports of societal abuses or discrimination based on religious belief or practice.

Religious demography

Cape Verde is an archipelago consisting of 10 islands, 9 of which are inhabited. More than 85 percent of the population is nominally Roman Catholic, according to an informal poll taken by local churches. The largest Protestant denomination is the Church of the Nazarene. Other groups include the Seventh-day Adventist Church, the Church of Jesus Christ of Latter-day Saints (Mormons), the Assemblies of God, the Universal Church of the Kingdom of God, and various other Pentecostal and evangelical groups. There are small Baháʼí Faith communities and a small but growing Muslim community. The number of atheists is estimated at less than 1 percent of the population.

There is no association between religious differences and ethnic or political affiliations; however, the Catholic hierarchy is sympathetic to the Movement for Democracy (MPD) party, which ruled the country from 1991 to 2001. While many Catholics once were hostile toward the Party for the Independence of Cape Verde (PAICV), which became the governing party in 2001, some have become supporters of the PAICV due to conflict within the MPD party and dissatisfaction over the latter's performance.

There were foreign missionary groups operating in the country.

Status of religious freedom

Legal and policy framework
The constitution provides for freedom of religion, and the government generally respected this right in practice. The government at all levels sought to protect this right in full and did not tolerate its abuse, either by governmental or private actors.

The constitution protects the right of individuals to choose and change their religion and to interpret their religious beliefs for themselves.

The Penal Code, which entered into force in 2004, states that violations of religious freedom are crimes subject to a penalty of between 3 months' and 3 years' imprisonment.

There is no state religion. The constitution provides for the separation of church and state and prohibits the state from imposing any religious beliefs and practices.

The Catholic Church enjoys a privileged status in national life. For example, the government provides the Catholic Church with free television broadcast time for religious services. Also, the government observes the Christian holy days of Ash Wednesday, Good Friday, Easter, All Saints' Day, and Christmas as official holidays. Furthermore, each municipality has a holiday to honor its patron saint. The government does not observe any other religious holidays.

The constitution provides for freedom of association. All associations, whether religious or secular, must register with the Ministry of Justice to be recognized as legal entities.

Registration is mandatory under the constitution and the law of associations. There are no special incentives for registering and failure to do so has not resulted in penalty or prosecution. One disadvantage of not registering is the inability of unregistered groups to apply for government or private loans and benefits as an association.

To register, a religious group must submit to the Ministry of Justice a copy of its charter and statutes, signed by the members of the group. The constitution sets forth the criteria for all associations, including religious ones, and states that the association may not be military or armed; may not be aimed at promoting violence, racism, xenophobia, or dictatorship; and may not be in violation of the penal law. Failure to register with the Ministry of Justice does not result in any restriction on religious belief or practice.

Restrictions on religious freedom
Government policy and practice contributed to the generally free practice of religion.

There were no reports of religious prisoners or detainees in the country.

Forced religious conversion
There were no reports of forced religious conversion, including of minor U.S. citizens who had been abducted or illegally removed from the United States, or of the refusal to allow such citizens to be returned to the United States.

Societal abuses and discrimination
There were no reports of societal abuses or discrimination based on religious belief or practice.

See also
Religion in Cape Verde
Human rights in Cape Verde

References
 United States Bureau of Democracy, Human Rights and Labor. Cape Verde: International Religious Freedom Report 2007. This article incorporates text from this source, which is in the public domain.

Cape Verde
Human_rights_in_Cape_Verde
Religion in Cape Verde